is a Japanese football player. He plays for Saurcos Fukui.

Playing career
Kohei Kurata played for J2 League club Matsumoto Yamaga FC from 2013 to 2014. Then he moved to Azul Claro Numazu mid-season.

Club statistics
Updated to 23 February 2018.

References

External links
Profile at Azul Claro Numazu

1990 births
Living people
Kansai University of International Studies alumni
People from Uki, Kumamoto
Association football people from Kumamoto Prefecture
Japanese footballers
J2 League players
J3 League players
Japan Football League players
Matsumoto Yamaga FC players
Azul Claro Numazu players
Saurcos Fukui players
Association football midfielders